("Article 52 of the Italian Football Federation regulations for internal organisation") governs the status of phoenix clubs in football in Italy. The article was revised in 2004, 2008, 2010 and 2014. Comma 1 describes the matter of the article, while Comma 2 forbids to sell a club sport right.

Comma 3 and 4
According to Comma 3 of the article, a new company from the same city could be admitted to the same division to replace a bankrupted football club company, if the company had acquired the bankrupted company as well as being willing to take over the liabilities to pay sports related debt, as well as any outstanding taxes.

Examples
Serie B
 F.C. Bari 1908: (2014)

Serie C
 Ascoli Picchio F.C. 1898: (2014)
 Carrarese Calcio 1908: (2016)
 U.S. Foggia: (2004)
 S.S. Virtus Lanciano 1924: (2008)
 A.C. Monza Brianza 1912: (2004)
 Delfino Pescara 1936: (2009)
 Aurora Pro Patria 1919: (2009)
 S.S. Sambenedettese Calcio: (2006)
 Savona F.B.C.: (2012)

Comma 4 rules the same matter of 3 in semiprofessional and amatorial leagues.
Serie D
 A.R.L.S.S.D. Atletico San Paolo Padova: (2014)
 A.S.D. Città di Foligno 1928: (2015)
U.S. Imperia 1923: (2000)
 A.C.R. Messina: (2009)
 S.S.D. Vivi Altotevere Sansepolcro: (2014)

Eccellenza
S.S.D. Massese: (2009)
 Fulgor Maceratese: (2009)
 F.C. Sezze Latina: (2003)
Promozione 
 A.C. Cesenatico: (2000)
 A.C. Trento S.C.S.D.: (2014)
 A.S.D. Amici del Verbania: (2006)

Comma 5 
Comma 5 rules the merging of two or more clubs. The new team follows the sport rights of the strongest of the merging clubs. It is one of the most ancient FIGC rules, and the most famous historical case of application was UC Sampdoria (1946) which inheredited and continued the history of its forerunner SG Sampierdarenese in Serie A.

Comma 6 to 9 (Lodo Petrucci)
Lodo Petrucci ('Petrucci Award') was a ruling named after Gianni Petrucci. Ratified in 2004, instead of acquiring the sports title by clearing the debt, FIGC could award the title to a new company based on the historic sporting merit of the old club. However, in such a situation the new club was automatically relegated to one level below the original club. In 2008 this changed to an automatic relegation two levels below the original club, and was limited to Serie A and B clubs only. However, the ruling was abolished completely in 2015 as its criteria were too subjective.

Examples
Serie A → Serie B
 Società Civile Campo Torino: (2005)
Serie B → Serie C1
Perugia Calcio: (2005)
Salernitana Calcio 1919: (2005)
Serie C1 → Serie C2
 A.S. Andria BAT: (2005)
 Benevento Calcio: (2005)
 Reggio Emilia F.C.: (2005)
 SPAL 1907: (2005)
 S.S.C. Venezia: (2005)

Some clubs unsuccessfully tried the "Lodo" so they had to pay part of the old debts to create the new phoenix club. These cases were privately managed by the FIGC without specific rules as the ACF Fiorentina case in 2002:
Napoli Soccer: (2004)
 A.C. Ancona: (2004)

Comma 10

Comma 10 of the article allowed a new company to be admitted to Serie D to replace the old football club that was not admitted to professional leagues. It was previously Comma 9, but was changed to Comma 10 in the 2010 amendment. One of the examples was the failed auction of Parma F.C., which had debt with stood at €22.6 million (reduced from over €70 million by the resettlement during administration).

Examples

References

general

specific

Association football terminology
Phoenix clubs (association football)